Johnny Malone may refer to:

Johnny Malone, character in Ed played by Jacob Pitts
Johnny Malone, character in Society Girl played by James Dunn (actor)
Johnny Malone (musician), see 1967 in music

See also
John Malone (disambiguation)